Truly Scrumptious is a fictional character in the 1968 film Chitty Chitty Bang Bang and stage production based on the children's novel of the same name by author Ian Fleming.

In the film the character is portrayed by Sally Ann Howes, after it was declined by Julie Andrews. Truly Scrumptious develops a romantic relationship with the widower Caractacus Potts (played by Dick Van Dyke). The character does not appear in the original book, in which Caractacus is married to Mimsie Pott (the surname as spelled in the book). The filmmakers felt that a budding romantic relationship would serve the film better than the marriage shown in the book, and so Caractacus was portrayed as a widower.

Film
Truly Scrumptious is introduced near the start of the film while driving her motorcar through the local village. Here she almost runs into two children, Jeremy and Jemima, who suddenly dash across the road in front of her. She swerves her motor car to avoid them, and it goes off the road and into a muddy little duck pond. Truly discovers they are playing truant from school and takes them home to inform their father, an absent-minded inventor named Caractacus Potts. When they arrive Truly is shocked to discover that Caractacus doesn't mind the children playing truant, and the two argue over his child-rearing methods. Caractacus loses his temper and Truly leaves in high dudgeon- but not before she inspects some of his inventions, including a sweet-making machine that is currently producing defective sweets with holes in them. Truly tries to explain that this is caused by the boiling point of the sugar being too high, but Caractacus cuts her off, believing she has no idea what she is talking about.

We soon discover that, as it happens, Truly is the daughter of a wealthy sweet factory owner, Lord Scrumptious. When Truly visits her father at his factory the next day, she sees Caractacus there, waiting to show her father the 'defective' sweets, which he has since their meeting fortuitously discovered can be played tunefully like penny whistles. Truly, who is developing an attachment to Jeremy and Jemima, unexpectedly supports Caractacus in making a successful pitch to her father (with the help of the song and dance routine ("Toot Sweets"). Lord Scrumptious is won over, but just as he is about to buy the product, a pack of neighborhood dogs attracted by the high pitched musical notes, descend on the factory and Lord Scrumptious furiously dismisses Caractacus and ejects the Potts family from his premises. However, this incident serves to further cement Truly's emotional involvement with the Potts family.

Out in her motorcar once more, Truly almost runs into Caractacus and the children in Chitty, their newly restored car, and in swerving to avoid them ends up stuck in the village pond once again. Since this time the car is stranded in the water, Truly is forced to allow Caractacus to carry her ashore - a physical intimacy of rather more significance in the era where the film is set. Jeremy and Jemima ask Truly to join them on their picnic and Caractacus agrees, superficially in an effort to mend fences after her support at the sweet factory, although the unspoken but well-understood subtext is that Truly and Caractacus are, despite themselves, attracted to one another. Once they are on their way again, Truly learns that the car is named Chitty Chitty Bang Bang (due to the noises it makes) and joins in the film's title song ("Chitty Chitty Bang Bang"). During the picnic at the beach Truly, Caractacus and the children play and interact happily as a family. Truly and the children declare their growing affection for each other in the song ("Truly Scrumptious"). Truly tells Caractacus how wonderful his children are which Caractacus agrees with. Meanwhile, the children spy on the couple from afar, hoping they are falling in love. Jemima observes 'Just as soon as he kisses her, then they'll have to get married!'.

Later, at the children's prompting, Caractacus begins to tell them and Truly a story about the nasty Baron Bomburst from Vulgaria who desires Chitty for himself, and inserting the four of them into the story. At this point, the film slips into a prolonged fantasy sequence representing the story being narrated. After being cut off by the rising tide, Chitty and the 'family' escape from Baron Bomburst's approaching gunship through Chitty's magical transformation into an amphibious motorcraft. Truly acknowledges Caractacus's devotion to the children and how well he's fulfilling the difficult role of a widowed parent. Caractacus implies in return that the children still need a mother. Afterwards, safely back at her family mansion, Truly declares her developing love for Caractacus ("Lovely Lonely Man") as she watches him and the children drive away.

The next day Truly and the Potts family encounter some unexpected and comical attempts by Vulgarian spies to steal their car. Unsuccessful in these attempts, The Baron then kidnaps Caractacus' father from the family home under the mistaken impression that he is the inventor who created the unusual car.  Truly and the rest of the Potts family see Grandpa being carried off by Baron Bomburst's airship and give chase in Chitty all the way to the Baron's castle in Vulgaria. Along the way, Chitty saves them again by magically transforming to a flying machine as they plunge over the chalk cliffs of Beachy Head. On arrival in Vulgaria it is apparent that there are no children to be seen and the locals seem terrified by their presence. Rescued from the street by the friendly local Toymaker, he informs them that in Vulgaria children are forbidden by the Baron's wife, Baroness Bomburst. Truly and the Potts family hide in the toyshop from a search-party of soldiers by disguising themselves as life-sized Jack-in-the-Boxes. However, the group hear that the soldiers have found Chitty and taken the car to the Baron.

Caractacus and the Toymaker go to investigate the security at the castle, leaving Truly and the children behind. Truly goes to get food for the children, returning just in time to witness Jeremy and Jemima's capture by the Baron's sinister Child Catcher. Caractacus, Truly and the Toymaker meet with the villagers' hidden children and plan their rescue mission. To comfort the children, Caractacus and Truly reprise a lullaby Caractacus sang to Jeremy and Jemima earlier in the film ("Hushabye Mountain"). Truly and Caractacus disguise themselves as life-sized dolls the Toymaker brings to the castle as gifts for the Baron's birthday. Truly and Caractacus dance and sing ("Doll on a Music Box"/"Truly Scrumptious") to distract the Baron, his wife, party guests, and court as the village children infiltrate the castle and prepare for battle. Grandpa is freed and the Potts children are rescued. With the Baron defeated, the family are hailed as heroes by the people of Vulgaria, and fly home in Chitty.

Here the extended storytelling fantasy sequence ends and an awkward moment immediately ensues as the children announce that 'Daddy and Truly were married and lived happily ever after'. Truly asks Caractacus if that is how the story ends, and, embarrassed, he starts the car and drives Truly home without answering. Caractacus then apologises for the children, saying they wouldn't understand how ridiculous it would be for a man in his situation to marry into a family of such wealth. Truly is affronted, saying before taking her leave that were she to say such a thing, Caractacus would call her a snob. During the journey home, the children's disappointment that things with Truly are not working out as they had hoped is very evident. However, a surprise awaits at the Potts family home. It transpires that Lord Scrumptious has changed his mind about 'Toot Sweets' and intends to buy the idea from Caractacus, planning to market them as dog treats. This newfound wealth removes the last remaining barrier to Caractacus admitting his love for Truly, and he hurriedly drives off in Chitty to find her. A near-collision forces Truly off the road into the duck pond for the third time, but this time in carrying her from the car Caractacus admits to her that the children were right and there's nothing ridiculous about the idea of them getting married. They kiss, and Truly declares 'Well, Mr Potts. Now you'll have to marry me!'

Character

Truly Scrumptious is an intelligent, educated, practical woman, the daughter of a wealthy industrialist. She is pragmatic and pro-active in her approach to life, and is not afraid to get involved in a situation others might overlook (such as two children playing truant from school) or to actively oppose wrongdoing, even at personal risk.  She is portrayed as feisty and modern (for the Edwardian era in which the film is set)-  more than ready to spar verbally with Caractacus, make the running in their developing romantic relationship, stand up to her pompous father, and indignantly reject social attitudes she disagrees with. She is also very warm and maternal towards the children.  She wears fashionable clothing (which is outdated for the film's setting), appropriate to her status but not necessarily appropriate for some practical purposes, such as escaping from duck ponds or restarting a car using a starting handle.

The author of the original story, Ian Fleming, was known for using puns in the naming of his female characters. Although the names of the female characters in the James Bond series, by the same author, are usually racy double entendres, Truly Scrumptious (chosen in homage to that tradition) is rather more innocent, as appropriate to a children's story. The pun on Truly is used in several ways in the recurring song of the same name "Truly Scrumptious".

In the film, a running gag is Truly running her car off the road into the same duck pond, which happens three times. The registration plate of Truly's motor car was CUB 1, an homage to the film's producer, Cubby Broccoli.

Behind the scenes

In the film, Truly sings the Sherman Brothers' song "Lovely Lonely Man" about Caractacus Potts. When the songwriters demonstrated the song for producer Cubby Broccoli he reportedly commented that the song was the most beautiful he'd ever heard. It was however the only song from the motion picture that wasn't included in the original stage production, although it is featured in the latest British tour.

Due to the length of the film, broadcast versions in the United States often cut either "Lovely Lonely Man" or "Roses of Success", usually on an alternating basis.

Due to a number of mishaps, including much inclement weather, the production of the motion picture ran many months over schedule. Heather Ripley in particular, who played Jemima and was from Dundee, hundreds of miles from the studios, found being away from most of her family and friends all this time very hard.  She and Adrian Hall, who played Jeremy but lived locally, have stated that Sally Ann Howes (and to a lesser extent Dick Van Dyke) made the experience greatly more bearable through the kind 'in loco parentis' role she adopted  on set.  In this way, the behind the scenes situation rather mirrored the relationship being portrayed on-screen, except that it was Heather's father who was entirely absent, back in Dundee.

Stage productions
Various actresses have now played Truly Scrumptious in stage productions of Chitty Chitty Bang Bang. These include the following in the order they have played the character.

Approximate Dates given where available
Emma Williams - Originated the role in London (2002-2003)
Caroline Sheen (2003-2004)
Scarlett Strallen (2004-2005)
Jo Gibb - Closed out the London Production (2005)
Erin Dilly - Originated the role on Broadway and closed out the Production (2005)
Marissa Dunlop - Originated the role in the National UK Tour (2005-2007)
Rachel Stanley - Closed out the National UK Tour (2008)
Kelly McCormick in the US National Tour in 2008-2009.
Rachael Beck - Australian Tour 2012-2013.
 Carrie Hope Fletcher - UK Tour (4 May 2016 - 2 October 2016)

References

Chitty Chitty Bang Bang characters
Film characters introduced in 1968
Female characters in film
Fictional English people